Skelton is an unincorporated community in Raleigh County, West Virginia, United States. It has a post office with ZIP code 25919.

The community was named after Skelton, England, the native home of a mining official.

References

Unincorporated communities in Raleigh County, West Virginia
Unincorporated communities in West Virginia
Coal towns in West Virginia